Nielles-lès-Bléquin (literally Nielles near Bléquin) is a commune in the Pas-de-Calais department in the Hauts-de-France region of France.

Geography
Nielles-lès-Bléquin lies about 12 miles (19 km) southwest of Saint-Omer, at the junction of the D191 and D202 roads, on the banks of the small river Bléquin.

Population

Places of interest
 The church of St. Martin, dating from the twelfth century.

See also
Communes of the Pas-de-Calais department

References

Nielleslesblequin